99th Street may refer to:

In New York
99th Street (Manhattan)
99th Street (IRT Third Avenue Line)
99th Street (IRT Second Avenue Line)
99th Street (IRT Ninth Avenue Line), a defunct aboveground station, closed 1940

Elsewhere
99th Street – Beverly Hills (Metra), Chicago